Abdul Gafur Khatri is a Rogan artist from Kutch district, Gujarat, India.

Biography
Khatri was born in a family of Rogan artists from Nirona village in Kutch. It was the last family of Rogan artists. In the 1980s, Khatri left Nirona and moved to Ahmedabad and then Mumbai for employment. Two years later, he returned and learned the art from his father and grandfather. Rogan painting saw a resurgence due to his efforts. In addition, Khatri and his family began training girls in the art which had previously been practised only by males. Four of his ten Rogan-practicing family members have been awarded with national or state awards. In 2014, Indian Prime Minister Narendra Modi visited the U.S. White House, and gave President Obama two rogan paintings, including a tree of life, which were painted by Khatri.

Awards
Khatri was awarded the State Award in 1988 and the National Award in 1997. He was also awarded the Padma Shri, the fourth highest civilian award by the Government of India, in 2019.

References

External links
 Abdul Gafur Khatri

People from Kutch district
Indian artisans
Recipients of the Padma Shri in arts